Lương Văn Được Em (born 1985 in Hồng Ngự District, Đồng Tháp Province) is a Vietnamese footballer who plays for the Đồng Tháp. He was called to Vietnam national football team

References

1985 births
Living people
Vietnamese footballers
Association football midfielders
Navibank Sài Gòn FC players
Footballers at the 2006 Asian Games
People from Đồng Tháp Province
Dong Thap FC players
V.League 1 players
Asian Games competitors for Vietnam